Nicola Bagioli (born 19 February 1995 in Sondrio) is an Italian cyclist, who currently rides for UCI ProTeam . In May 2019, he was named in the startlist for the 2019 Giro d'Italia.

Major results
2016
 2nd Giro del Belvedere
 3rd Trofeo Città di San Vendemiano
2018
 1st  Mountains classification, Tirreno–Adriatico
 7th Overall Tour du Haut Var
2019
 2nd Trofeo Laigueglia
 3rd Ronde van Drenthe
2020 
 7th Gran Trittico Lombardo

Grand Tour general classification results timeline

References

External links

1995 births
Living people
Italian male cyclists
People from Sondrio
Cyclists from the Province of Sondrio
21st-century Italian people